The Lesbian Gay Bi Transgender Community Center of Metropolitan St. Louis was a community organization serving the lesbian, gay, bisexual, transgender, questioning and ally community of St. Louis, Missouri.

History
The organization was formed in early 2005 after the National Gay and Lesbian Task Force held its 2004 annual Creating Change Conference in St. Louis, when the local co-chairs of the committee convened a meeting to establish the needs of the St. Louis LBGT community. The meeting established the need for a community center, and a committee to create the center was formed and developed as  The Lesbian Gay Bi Transgender Community Center of Metropolitan St. Louis.

Building plans and services
The organization had a facility which it is using as a community center.  The facility contained an emerging multimedia library, meeting rooms, and a lounge.  The location was created "in an effort to create a safe and supportive as well as positive environment for the lesbian, gay, bisexual, transgender, and questioning (LGBTQ) community in the metropolitan St. Louis area." The organization had outlined plans to serve the LGBT community through conversation groups, workshops, networking sessions, projects, and events.

Non-profit status
The organization had both federal, 501(c)(3), and state (Missouri) tax-exemption as a corporation.

Logos

See also

List of LGBT community centers

References

External links

 CenterLink—The Community of LGBT Centers (NALGBTCC)
 PrideCenter of St. Louis — opened 2017, a new LGBTQIA+ community center serving St. Louis

LGBT in Missouri
LGBT community centers in the United States
Organizations based in St. Louis